Roads is a 2019 internationally co-produced drama film, directed by Sebastian Schipper, from a screenplay by Schipper and Oliver Ziegenbalg. It stars Fionn Whitehead and Stéphane Bak.

It had its world premiere at the Tribeca Film Festival on 25 April 2019 and was released in Germany on 30 May 2019, by StudioCanal.

Cast
 Fionn Whitehead as Gyllen
 Stéphane Bak as William
 Moritz Bleibtreu as Luttger
 Ben Chaplin as Paul
 Marie Burchard as Valerie
 Paul Brannigan as Alan

Production
In June 2017, it was announced Fionn Whitehead had been cast in the film, with Sebastian Schipper directing from a screenplay he wrote alongside Oliver Ziegenbalg. In August 2017, Stéphane Bak, Moritz Bleibtreu, and Ben Chaplin joined the cast of the film.

Principal photography began in August 2017. During the production stage, the project was named Caravan.

Release
It had its world premiere at the Tribeca Film Festival on 25 April 2019. It was released in Germany on 30 May 2019.

References

External links

2019 films
English-language German films
English-language French films
German drama films
British drama films
French drama films
Films directed by Sebastian Schipper
StudioCanal films
2010s English-language films
2010s British films
2010s French films
2010s German films